A presidential election is the election of any head of state whose official title is President.

Elections by country

Albania
The president of Albania is elected by the Assembly of Albania who are elected by the Albanian public.

Chile

The president of Chile is elected by the Chilean people for a four-year term. Sitting presidents are not allowed to run for reelection, but former presidents may do so.

China

The president and vice president of China, are elected by the National People's Congress (NPC) on the nomination of the NPC Presidium. In practice, the presidential candidate is chosen through an informal process within the Chinese Communist Party (CCP), which is headed by the CCP general secretary.

Czech Republic

President of the Czech Republic is elected for a five-year term. Prior 2013, the election was indirect by the Parliament. The first direct election was held in 2013.

El Salvador

El Salvador elects its head of state – the president of El Salvador – directly through a fixed-date general election whose winner is decided by absolute majority. A presidential term in of 5 years and can’t be re-election immediately, to become president again they have to wait one electoral period to run again. Current president of El Salvador is Nayib Bukele

France

The president of France is elected for a five-year (since 2002) term by the public.

Indonesia

The president and vice president of Indonesia are elected for a maximum of two five-year terms. Since 2004, presidential elections in Indonesia have been determined by popular vote.

Iran
The president of Iran is elected to a four-year term by the public. The first presidential election in Iran was held in 1980, following the Iranian Revolution of 1979 which resulted in the overthrow of the monarchy, although the president's power is second to the Supreme Leader.

Ireland

The president of Ireland is elected by the Irish people for a seven-year term.

Israel
The president of Israel is elected by the Knesset to a single seven-year term, though the role of the president is largely ceremonial as the real power of the country is in the hands of the prime minister.

Kyrgyzstan
The president of Kyrgyzstan undergoes a single term of six years.

Lithuania
The president of Lithuania is elected for a five-year term by the citizens of Lithuania.

Mexico
The president of Mexico is elected for a six-year term by the public. The first presidential election in Mexico was in 1934, although these weren't considered to have met international standards until 1994.

Palestine
The president of the Palestinian National Authority is the highest-ranking political position in the State of Palestine and is elected to a four-year term by the public.

Philippines
The president of the Philippines is the highest-ranking political position in the Philippines and is elected to a six-year term by the general populace. The most recent presidential election was held in 2022 which resulted in Bongbong Marcos being elected as the 17th President of the Philippines.

Poland
The first President of Second Polish Republic was Gabriel Narutowicz. In the Second Polish Republic, the president was elected by the Parliament, while in the Third Polish Republic the president is elected for a five-year term by the public. The most recent presidential election was the 2020 Polish presidential election. The next election will take place in 2025.

Russia

The president of Russia is elected for a six-year term by the public. The first presidential election in Russia was held in 1991.

Singapore 

The President of Singapore is directly elected by popular vote, subject to potential candidates meeting stringent qualifications set out in the Constitution, in order to run for office.

South Africa 
The president of South Africa is elected by the National Assembly who are elected by the South African public. The leader of the largest elected party in the National Assembly becomes President for a five-year term. The first non-racial elections were held in 1994 to mark the end of apartheid.

Switzerland 
The president of the Swiss Confederation is elected every year for a one-year term by the Federal Assembly among the seven Federal Councillors who collectively form together the Head of State. Primus inter pares, the president has no powers over and above the other six Councillors and continues to head his or her department. Traditionally the duty rotates among the members in order of seniority and the previous year's vice president becomes president.

Republic of China

Candidates for President of the Republic of China must be ROC citizens who have reached 40 years of age, has set their domicile in the ROC for not less than 15 years and lived in the free regions of the ROC for not less than 6 consecutive months. Naturalised citizens, residents of Hong Kong, Macau or the People's Republic of China, soldiers and election officials are not eligible.

Tanzania
The president of Tanzania is elected by general vote every five years.  As of 2015, 24,001,134 people in Tanzania were registered to vote.  Voters are registered upon completion of a Biometric Voters Register kit.  The current president is John Magufuli.

Turkey

The president of Turkey is elected for a maximum of two five-year terms. Prior to 2014, the election was indirect by the Parliament. Since 2014, presidential elections in Turkey have been determined by popular vote.

Ukraine
The president of Ukraine is elected for a five-year term by the public. The first presidential election in Ukraine was held in 1991 following the dissolution of the Soviet Union.

United States

The United States has elections on the state and local levels.  The Electoral College is the constitutional body that elects the president, and voters actually vote for the members of the Electoral College at the state level. In the U.S., the presidential elections at the state-level decide which people shall become members of the Electoral College for each state, and those members of the Electoral College in turn cast their votes for the presidential candidates. The first recorded Electoral College presidential election in the United States was in 1788−1789, in which George Washington won.

Venezuela
The president of Venezuela is elected by the public to a six-year term.

List of presidential elections

Elections in Albania
Elections in Argentina
Elections in Belarus
Elections in Brazil
Elections in Estonia
Elections in El Salvador
Elections in Finland
Elections in France
Elections in Germany
Elections in Hungary
Elections in India
Elections in Indonesia
Elections in Iran
Elections in the Republic of Ireland
Elections in Israel
Elections in Italy
Elections in Mexico
Elections in the Palestinian National Authority
Elections in Poland
Elections in Portugal
Elections in Russia
Elections in South Africa
Elections in South Korea
Elections in Spain
Elections in Taiwan
Elections in Turkey
Elections in Ukraine
Elections in the United States
Elections in Venezuela

See also
President (government title)
Who is elected

References

External links

 
Elections by type